Gadeoksan is a mountain in South Korea. Its area extends across Gapyeong County, Gyeonggi-do and the city of Chuncheon in Gangwon-do.

See also
List of mountains in Korea

Notes

References

Mountains of South Korea
Chuncheon
Gapyeong County
Mountains of Gangwon Province, South Korea
Mountains of Gyeonggi Province